Dr. Manik Saha (born 8 January 1953) is an Indian politician serving as the 11th and current Chief Minister of Tripura since 2022. He represents the Town Bordowali constituency in the Tripura Legislative Assembly Since 2022.He was also the member of Rajya Sabha from 2022 until he became Chief Minister in 2022.He is a member of Bharatiya Janata Party since 2016 and Indian National Congress before 2016.

Political career 
Saha was a member of Indian National Congress before joining Bharatiya Janata Party in 2016. He became the President of the Bharatiya Janata Party, Tripura unit in 2020 till 2022. In June 2022, Saha was elected as MLA.

Chief Minister of Tripura

On 14 May 2022, just a year before assembly polls in the state, Biplab Kumar Deb resigned from his post. After a hurriedly called legislature party meeting, BJP announced Saha's name as his successor and said he would extend cooperation to the new chief minister. Saha took oath as the 11th Chief Minister of Tripura on 15 May 2022.

Personal life
Saha was born to Makhan Lal Saha and Priya Bala Saha on 8 January 1953. He received his B.D.S. and M.D.S. in "Oral and Maxillofacial Surgery" degrees from Govt. Dental College, Patna, Bihar and King George's Medical College, Lucknow. Saha is married to Swapna Saha, with whom he has two daughters. He is also the president of the Tripura Cricket Association. Before he joined mainstream politics, Saha used to teach in Tripura Medical College located at Hapania.

References

1953 births
Living people
Bharatiya Janata Party politicians from Tripura
Rajya Sabha members from Tripura
People from Tripura
Chief Ministers of Tripura
Former members of Indian National Congress
Tripura MLAs 2023–2028